The Albert H. Wheeler House is a historic house at 219 South Street in Southbridge, Massachusetts.  It was built in the late 19th century, and is an example of a modest Queen Anne Victorian.  Its owner, Albert H. Wheeler, was a Civil War veteran and dry goods merchant with a shop in the Globe Village neighborhood.  Wheeler died in the 1910s, and his widow lived in the house until at least 1928.  It was eventually acquired by the American Optical Company and used for company housing.

The house follows a simple L-shaped plan, with a front porch in the crook of the L that was added in the 20th century.  The house was added to the National Register of Historic Places in 1989.

See also
National Register of Historic Places listings in Southbridge, Massachusetts
National Register of Historic Places listings in Worcester County, Massachusetts

References

Houses in Southbridge, Massachusetts
Queen Anne architecture in Massachusetts
National Register of Historic Places in Southbridge, Massachusetts
Houses on the National Register of Historic Places in Worcester County, Massachusetts